Chaqabol (also Romanized as Chaqābol, Chaqābal, and Choqā Bol; also known as Choghā Bol) is a city in and the administrative headquarters for Rumeshkhan County, Lorestan Province, Iran. At the 2006 census, its population was 4,801, in 1,037 families.

References

Populated places in Rumeshkhan County
Cities in Lorestan Province